The 2019 Cheltenham Gold Cup (known as the Magners Gold Cup for sponsorship reasons) was the 91st annual running of the Cheltenham Gold Cup horse race and was held at Cheltenham Racecourse, Gloucestershire, England, on 15 March 2019.

The race was won by Al Boum Photo, ridden by Paul Townend and trained by Willie Mullins.	

Invitation Only ridden by Patrick Mullins suffered a fatal injury after a fall during the race.

Details
 Sponsor: Magners
 Winner's prize money: £351,687.50
 Going: Good to Soft
 Number of runners: 16
 Winner's time: 6m 39.06s

References

External links
2019 Cheltenham Gold Cup  Official Website
2019 Cheltenham Gold Cup at Racing Post

Cheltenham Gold Cup
 2019
Cheltenham Gold Cup
2010s in Gloucestershire
Cheltenham Gold Cup